Safari is the eleventh studio album by Italian singer-songwriter Jovanotti. Preceded by the single "Fango", it was released in Italy on 17 January 2008. The album features guests including Ben Harper, who plays a guitar solo in "Fango", Italian band Negramaro's frontman Giuliano Sangiorgi, Brazilian musician Sérgio Mendes and American recording artist Michael Franti.

Safari was a commercial success, topping the Italian Albums Chart for seven weeks and being certified five times platinum by the Federation of the Italian Music Industry. It also became the best-selling album of 2008 in Italy, while its second single, "A te", ranked first in the Italian annual chart.

Track listing

Charts and certifications

Peak positions

Year-end charts

Certifications

References

External links
 Official URL with Song Lyrics

2008 albums
Jovanotti albums
Albums produced by Michele Canova
Universal Music Italy albums